Gonzalo Adrián Falcón Vitancour (born 16 November 1996) is a Uruguayan professional footballer who plays as a goalkeeper for Ecuadorian Serie A club L.D.U. Quito.

Career
A youth academy product of Juventud, Falcón made his professional debut on 10 April 2016 in a 0–0 draw against River Plate.

Falcón joined Boston River prior to 2018 season and became club's first-choice goalkeeper. He made his continental debut on 11 April 2018 in a 2–1 loss against Colombian side Jaguares de Córdoba.

Career statistics

Club

References

External links
 

1996 births
Living people
Footballers from Montevideo
Uruguayan footballers
Association football goalkeepers
Uruguayan Primera División players
Ecuadorian Serie A players
Juventud de Las Piedras players
Boston River players
L.D.U. Quito footballers
Uruguayan expatriate footballers
Uruguayan expatriate sportspeople in Ecuador
Expatriate footballers in Ecuador